Peter McCracken (4 February 1883 – 9 November 1936) was an Australian rules footballer who played with St Kilda in the Victorian Football League (VFL).

He subsequently moved to New Zealand where he was a sheep farmer, enlisting to serve towards the end of World War I but not seeing active duty.

References

External links 

1883 births
1936 deaths
Australian rules footballers from Victoria (Australia)
St Kilda Football Club players